David Justin Freeman (born December 22, 1984) is a Christian minister, private educator and conservative political activist from the state of Georgia. He is best known for having been controversially arrested in Hall County, Georgia after publicly declaring his religious opposition against the public education system in 2014. His conviction in that matter was ultimately overturned by the Supreme Court of Georgia.

Early life and career
Freeman was born in Gwinnett County Georgia and attended public schools. He entered the University of Georgia as a music education major where he studied from 2005-2009 before becoming disillusioned with the state of public education. For some time thereafter Freeman served as a music minister and in a variety of ministry capacities until his arrest in 2014. He also married and had children, whom he homeschooled. In 2016, Freeman became a founding Elder at eastjordan.church, where he served on a volunteer basis as a web developer.

Political advocacy
Freeman first entered the political world as a precinct chairman in the Hall County Republican Party in 2012, and that year served as a delegate for Hall County to the Georgia Republican Party's State Convention, where he was noted for arguing in favor of strict constitutional construction regarding a party resolution on the National Defense Authorization Act for Fiscal Year 2012. The next year, Freeman was voted in as chairman for the Georgia Ninth District of the Republican Liberty Caucus and was recognized at the 2013 state convention for his arguments that the state party should abide very strictly by its established rules. Freeman also took up a leadership role in the Lanier Tea Party Patriots, where he twice served as a master of ceremonies for their annual tax-day rally.

Disagreement with sheriff
In April 2013, Freeman publicly came into conflict with Hall County Sheriff Gerald Couch concerning the constitutionality of federal laws which Freeman perceived to overstep the bounds of the 2nd Amendment to the US Constitution, and in the following months filed numerous complaints to the Sheriff regarding Sheriff's deputies speeding in patrol cars during non-emergencies, sometimes under particularly dangerous conditions (on icy roads, in school zones, and at very high speeds).

12Stone Church controversy
On August 3, 2014, Freeman attended services with his family at 12Stone Church in Flowery Branch, Georgia, where he served as a volunteer minister to youths. On that day, Jason Berry (then pastor at that campus), displayed video of a Staples commercial which portrayed children as being particularly depressed about returning to school, and offered prayers for local public school teachers. At trial and in his appeals, Freeman contended that he was displeased with the display because of youth in the church who had expressed suicidal thoughts in the lead-up to the new school year. In response, Freeman (who was positioned in the back of the sanctuary about 50 yards away from Berry) raised his middle finger to Berry. At trial, Freeman stated that it was his intention to object without disrupting the service, saying "I believe that I would have been failing in my duty as a minister to the church and God if I had not confronted Jason for what he said, and I believe that I did so in the most appropriate way possible." Thereafter, when the church service had ended, Freeman stood and addressed the crowd saying, "It is your responsibility to raise your own children, and it is a sin to give them to a godless government."

Arrest, detention, and trial
On the day of the incident, a warrant was issued for Freeman's arrest for "Disrupting a Public Gathering." This warrant was invalid, because Georgia's "Disrupting a Public Gathering" law had been declared unconstitutional in 2006. According to testimony by multiple witnesses at Freeman's trial, Freeman was arrested at his home by a SWAT team armed with semiautomatic weapons and accompanied by a K9 unit. At trial, the state denied that a SWAT team had been at Freeman's home, but the arresting officer on record, Mike Lusk, had been identified previously in The Gainesville Times as a member of the Hall County SWAT team. Freeman later claimed in a lawsuit against the Hall County Sheriff Gerald Couch that after his arrest he was held nude in solitary confinement, threatened with death, and denied bedding and basic hygienic items (among other abuses) during a three-day stay at the Hall County Detention Center.

Two of the officers most closely tied to Freeman's arrest left the Sheriff's office in disgrace shortly thereafter. Jacob Haney, the Sergeant on duty at the time of Freeman's arrest, resigned after he was caught having an on-duty affair with a Flowery Branch policewoman. Mike Lusk, the officer who arrested Freeman, was himself arrested for an unrelated "Invasion of Privacy" charge on May 22, 2015 after a GBI investigation and was released on a $10,000 bond.

In May 2015, charges against Freeman for "Obstruction" and "Disrupting a Public Gathering" were dismissed by Hall County State Court Judge Larry Baldwin, and the state replaced these with a charge of "Disorderly Conduct," with the state alleging that holding up a middle finger and shouting a political opinion in public represented a credible threat to life, limb, and health. Freeman was tried and convicted by a jury on January 11–12, 2016.

Appeals and argument before Supreme Court

On January 18, 2017, Freeman's appeal was transferred by the Georgia Court of Appeals to the Georgia Supreme Court on the grounds that his free speech arguments raised a constitutional question over which the Court of Appeals could not have jurisdiction. Oral arguments in the case were held at the Georgia Supreme Court on May 15, 2017, with Freeman representing himself, and Daniel SanMiguel representing Hall County. Arguments before the court focused primarily on whether Georgia's disorderly conduct statute (16-11-39(a)(1)), is unconstitutionally broad, whether or not people have a constitutionally protected right to shout in a public place, and on whether or not Freeman's conduct – standing, giving a middle finger from 50 yards away, and shouting a religious message – could possibly have violated the statute by representing a reasonable threat of harm.

The statute in question reads: "A person commits the offense of disorderly conduct when such person commits any of the following: Acts in a violent or tumultuous manner toward another person whereby such person is placed in reasonable fear of the safety of such person's life, limb, or health;" Freeman argued that the words "tumultuous" and "reasonable" are not clearly defined in the law and leave intelligent people to guess about their meaning. Freeman also argued that the first amendment protects ministers to speak controversial messages in their churches. SanMiguel argued that while none of Freeman's actions constituted obscenity or represented a reasonable threat in themselves, the actions taken as a whole represented disorderly conduct in their totality.

On October 2, 2017, the Supreme Court of Georgia reversed Freeman's disorderly conduct conviction on the grounds that his conduct could not have possibly violated Georgia's disorderly conduct statute, and that the middle finger is protected speech. At the time that the conviction was overturned, Freeman stated that he was working mowing lawns as a result of his false conviction, despite the fact that he is skilled in computer programming.

Lawsuit against Hall County sheriff
In August 2016, Freeman filed a suit in the Georgia Northern District court against Hall County Sheriff Gerald Couch and other employees of the Sheriff's Office, alleging that he had been subjected to abuses during his arrest and stay at the Hall County jail. Federal Judge Richard W. Story ultimately dismissed the suit without a hearing, stating that "neither a State nor its officials acting in their official capacities are 'persons'... On the contrary, states and their officials, acting in official capacities, are immune from suit."

Reaction to the Supreme Court ruling
After the Supreme Court's decision, Freeman blogged about the experience. In his blog, Freeman claimed that he was sexually abused and tortured for his faith while he was held at the Hall County Detention Center, and has also claimed (providing an audio recording from a possible witness) that the police attempted to assassinate him while he was awaiting trial, forcing his family to flee from the state and live in hiding for several years. Freeman has also relayed additional stories of interactions with police and the courts since his arrest, which he claims represent a pattern of intentional abuse against him, ostensibly for his conservative Christian views and advocacy against abuses of power by police.

2020 arrest and lawsuit
According to a lawsuit filed in May 2020 in U.S. District Court in Rome, Freeman drove past police activity in Polk County and yelled an expletive at the officers. He was then pursued, arrested, charged with disorderly conduct, reckless driving, and obstruction, and jailed for two days before being released. Freeman's lawsuit against the officers contends that his insult was political speech and protected by the First Amendment.

References

American Protestant ministers and clergy
Georgia (U.S. state) Republicans
American prisoners and detainees
Living people
1984 births
Protestant religious leaders convicted of crimes
Overturned convictions in the United States